Leszko II (Leszek, Lestek, Lestko) was a legendary ruler of Poland, firstly mentioned by Wincenty Kadłubek in the Chronica seu originale regum et principum Poloniae. Alleged progenitor of the Popielids dynasty. Father of Leszko III.

References
 Gerard Labuda: Studia nad początkami państwa polskiego. T. II. Poznań: Wydawnictwo Naukowe UAM, 1988. .
 Jerzy Strzelczyk: Mity, podania i wierzenia dawnych Słowian. Poznań: Rebis, 2007. .
 Mistrz Wincenty tzw. Kadłubek, Kronika Polska, tł. i oprac. B. Kürbis, Wrocław 1996, s. 26-28 (I, 13)

Legendary Polish monarchs